This article lists those members of the Royal Air Force of the United Kingdom who have become either nationally or internationally famous.  This could either be due to commanding squadrons or higher formations in memorable operations, by being awarded high honours or by gaining fame subsequent to their RAF service.

Notable Royal Air Force personnel
 Hugh Trenchard, 1st Viscount Trenchard – founding father of the RAF
 Arthur Tedder, 1st Baron Tedder –  WWII RAF Commander, deputy to Eisenhower who received Germany's surrender at the end of the war in Europe, post-war Chief of Air Staff
 Hugh Dowding, 1st Baron Dowding – Commanding officer or RAF Fighter Command before WWII, developer of Dowding system used during Battle of Britain
 Sir Arthur "Bomber" Harris – C-in-C RAF Bomber Command during World War II
 Sir Douglas Bader – Amputee and fighter pilot & POW during Battle of Britain
 Sir Keith Park – New Zealander – AOC No. 11 Group RAF during Battle of Britain
 Sir Frank Whittle – Co-inventor of the turbojet
 Guy Gibson – Dambusters raid leader and VC holder
 Leonard Cheshire – Charity founder and VC holder
 Henry Allingham – World War I veteran and last surviving founder member of the RAF
 David Henderson – founding father of the Royal Air Force.

Notable people who previously served in the RAF
 Richard Attenborough – Actor and director
 Pam Ayres – Poet, TV & Radio presenter
 David Bailey (photographer)
 Ralph Barker – Writer
 Errol Walton Barrow – First Prime Minister of Barbados
 Alan Bates – Actor
 Raymond Baxter – Television presenter and commentator
 Tony Benn – British politician
 Frank Bossard – MI6 personnel who spied for the USSR
 Richard Burton – Actor, served as a navigator
 Brian Blessed – Actor
 Arthur C. Clarke – Science fiction author
 Alex Coomber – Bronze medalist in the 2002 Winter Olympics.
 Roald Dahl – Author. A flying ace who rose to the rank of Wing Commander
 Hilary Devey – Dragons Den – WRAF Air Traffic Control Assistant
 Denholm Elliott – Actor
 Fred Feast – Actor (Coronation Street), served as a Physical Training Instructor (PTI)
 Bruce Forsyth – Entertainer and show host; served between 1947 and 1949 under National Service
 Bruce Barrymore Halpenny-British military historian and Author, served Royal Air Force Police
 Tony Hancock – Comic actor (RAF Regiment)
 Rex Harrison – Actor, reached the rank of Flight Lieutenant
 Rollo Hayman – Rhodesian farmer and politician
 Godfrey Hounsfield – Nobel laureate and co-inventor of Computed tomography.
 George Hutchinson – Professional footballer
 Peter Imbert – Police Officer, served Royal Air Force Police
 T. E. Lawrence – 'Lawrence of Arabia'. Enlisted first as Aircraftman J.H Ross, and later as Aircraftman T.E Shaw
 Peter Larter – England rugby player
 Christopher Lee – Actor, reached the rank of Flight Lieutenant
 Laurence Meredith – Survived 1000 foot parachute-less fall in 1942, Louis Mountbatten staff officer, RAF India historian. United Press International reporter.
 Warren Mitchell – Actor
 Bob Monkhouse – Entertainer, comedian, game show host
 Patrick Moore – Astronomer, broadcaster and author
 Frank Muir – Comic writer
 Alex Murphy (rugby league) Great Britain rugby league player
 Peter Sellers – Comedian and actor, gained the NCO rank of Corporal
 Josef Singer (1923–2009) – Israeli President of Technion – Israel Institute of Technology
 Ian Smith – Rhodesian Prime Minister; reached the rank of Flight Lieutenant during Second World War service
 Norman Tebbit – Lord Tebbit, Politician. A member of the Conservative Party
 Gordon Turnbull – psychiatrist
 Rory Underwood – England rugby player
 Michael Ventris – deciphered Linear B script
 Tony Walton – set/costume designer, director
 Martin Whitcombe – England 'B' rugby player
 Bill Wyman- Bass player, Rolling Stones
 Jeff Young (rugby player) – Welsh rugby player

References

 *